Kondofrey Heights (‘Kondofreyski Vazvisheniya’ \kon-do-'frey-ski v&z-vi-'she-ni-ya\) are the heights rising to 1115 m (Skakavitsa Peak) on the southeast side of Trinity Peninsula, Antarctic Peninsula.  Situated east of Detroit Plateau, south of Victory Glacier and west of Prince Gustav Channel, Weddell Sea.  Linked to Detroit Plateau by Podgumer Col.  Extending 9.2 km in east-west direction and 7.5 km in north-south direction.

The heights are named after the settlement of Kondofrey in western Bulgaria.

Location

German-British mapping in 1996.

Maps
 Trinity Peninsula. Scale 1:250000 topographic map No. 5697. Institut für Angewandte Geodäsie and British Antarctic Survey, 1996.
 Antarctic Digital Database (ADD). Scale 1:250000 topographic map of Antarctica. Scientific Committee on Antarctic Research (SCAR), 1993–2016.

References
 Bulgarian Antarctic Gazetteer. Antarctic Place-names Commission. (details in Bulgarian, basic data in English)
 Kondofrey Heights. SCAR Composite Antarctic Gazetteer

External links
Kondofrey Heights. Adjusted Copernix satellite image

Mountains of Trinity Peninsula
Bulgaria and the Antarctic